Route 705 is a highway in New Brunswick, Canada that runs from an intersection of Route 124 in Kars to an intersection with Route 710 in Henderson Settlement, a distance of 31.3 kilometres. In 2009, the cable ferry service connecting Route 705 in Wickham to Route 102 in Hampstead was cancelled by the New Brunswick Department of Transportation.

See also
List of New Brunswick provincial highways

References

New Brunswick provincial highways
Roads in Queens County, New Brunswick
Roads in Kings County, New Brunswick